Broxton is a city in Coffee County, Georgia, United States. Per the 2020 census, the population was 1,060.

History
An early variant name was "Gully Branch". The Georgia General Assembly incorporated the place as the "Town of Broxton" in 1904, with the corporate limits extending in a  radius from the front-yard well of one Jesse Lott. The present name is after Broxton Creek.

Geography
Broxton is located in north-central Coffee County at  (31.627415, -82.889709). U.S. Route 441 passes through the city, leading south  to Douglas, the county seat, and north  to McRae.

Demographics

2020 census

Note: the US Census treats Hispanic/Latino as an ethnic category. This table excludes Latinos from the racial categories and assigns them to a separate category. Hispanics/Latinos can be of any race.

2000 Census
As of the census of 2000, there were 1,428 people, 527 households, and 363 families residing in the city. The racial makeup of the city was 42.65% White, 50.35% African American, 0.28% Native American, 5.67% from other races, and 1.05% from two or more races. Hispanic or Latino of any race were 7.49% of the population.

There were 527 households, out of which 38.7% had children under the age of 18 living with them, 41.2% were married couples living together, 23.0% had a female householder with no husband present, and 31.1% were non-families. 27.5% of all households were made up of individuals, and 14.4% had someone living alone who was 65 years of age or older.  The average household size was 2.68 and the average family size was 3.28.

In the city, the population was spread out, with 32.1% under the age of 18, 9.2% from 18 to 24, 27.8% from 25 to 44, 19.8% from 45 to 64, and 11.1% who were 65 years of age or older.  The median age was 31 years. For every 100 females, there were 86.7 males.  For every 100 females age 18 and over, there were 77.5 males.

The median income for a household in the city was $22,900, and the median income for a family was $26,211. Males had a median income of $24,408 versus $19,226 for females. The per capita income for the city was $11,984.  About 22.0% of families and 26.9% of the population were below the poverty line, including 34.0% of those under age 18 and 25.0% of those age 65 or over.

References

Cities in Georgia (U.S. state)
Cities in Coffee County, Georgia